A full-frame DSLR is a digital single-lens reflex camera (DSLR) with a 35 mm image sensor format. Historically, 35 mm was one of the standard film formats, alongside larger ones, such as medium format and large format. The full-frame DSLR is in contrast to full-frame mirrorless interchangeable-lens cameras, and DSLR and mirrorless cameras with smaller sensors (for instance, those with a size equivalent to APS-C-size film), much smaller than a full 35 mm frame. Many digital cameras, both compact and SLR models, use a smaller-than-35 mm frame as it is easier and cheaper to manufacture imaging sensors at a smaller size. Historically, the earliest digital SLR models, such as the Nikon NASA F4 or Kodak DCS 100, also used a smaller sensor.

Kodak states that 35 mm film (note: in "Academy format", 21.0 mm × 15.2 mm) has the equivalent of 6K horizontal resolution, according to a senior vice president of IMAX. This equates to 10K horizontal resolution in full-frame size.

Use of 35 mm film-camera lenses
If the lens mounts are compatible, many lenses, including manual-focus models, designed for 35 mm cameras can be mounted on DSLR cameras. When a lens designed for a full-frame camera, whether film or digital, is mounted on a DSLR with a smaller sensor size, only the center of the lenses image circle is captured.  The edges are cropped off, which is equivalent to zooming in on the center section of the imaging area. The ratio of the size of the full-frame 35 mm format to the size of the smaller format is known as the "crop factor" or "focal-length multiplier", and is typically in the range 1.3–2.0 for non-full-frame digital SLRs.

Advantages and disadvantages of full-frame digital SLRs

35 mm lenses

When used with lenses designed for full frame film or digital cameras, full-frame DSLRs offer a number of advantages compared to their smaller-sensor counterparts. One advantage is that wide-angle lenses designed for full-frame 35 mm retain that same wide angle of view. On smaller-sensor DSLRs, wide-angle lenses have smaller angles of view equivalent to those of longer-focal-length lenses on 35 mm film cameras. For example, a 24 mm lens on a camera with a crop factor of 1.5 has a 62° diagonal angle of view, the same as that of a 36 mm lens on a 35 mm film camera. On a full-frame digital camera, the 24 mm lens has the same 84° angle of view as it would on a 35 mm film camera.

If the same lens is used on both full-frame and cropped formats, and the subject distance is adjusted to have the same field of view (i.e., the same framing of the subject) in each format, depth of field (DoF) is in inverse proportion to the format sizes, so for the same f-number, the full-frame format will have less DoF. Equivalently, for the same DoF, the full-frame format will require a larger f-number (that is, a smaller aperture diameter). This relationship is approximate and holds for moderate subject distances, breaking down as the distance with the smaller format approaches the hyperfocal distance, and as the magnification with the larger format approaches the macro range.

The rear element of any SLR lens must have clearance for the camera's reflex mirror to move up when the shutter is released;  with a wide-angle lens, this requires a retrofocus design, which is generally of inferior optical quality. Because a cropped-format sensor can have a smaller mirror, less clearance is needed, and some lenses, such as the EF-S lenses for the Canon APS-C sized bodies, are designed with a shorter back-focus distance; however, they cannot be used on bodies with larger sensors.

The full-frame sensor can also be useful with wide-angle perspective control or tilt/shift lenses; in particular, the wider angle of view is often more suitable for architectural photography.

While full-frame DSLRs offer advantages for wide-angle photography, smaller-sensor DSLRs offer some advantages for telephoto photography because the smaller angle of view of small-sensor DSLRs enhances the telephoto effect of the lenses. For example, a 200 mm lens on a camera with a crop factor of 1.5× has the same angle of view as a 300 mm lens on a full-frame camera. The extra "reach", for a given number of pixels, can be helpful in specific areas of photography such as wildlife or sports.

Lower size sensors also allow for the use of a wider range of lenses, since some types of optical impurities (specifically vignetting) are most visible around the edge of the lens. By only using the center of the lens, these impurities are not noticed. In practice, this allows for the use of lower cost lenses without corresponding loss of quality.

Finally, full frame sensors allow for sensor designs that result in lower noise levels at high ISO  and a greater dynamic range in captured images. Pixel density is lower on full frame sensors. This means the pixels can be either spaced further apart from each other, or each photodiode can be manufactured at a slightly larger size. Larger pixel sizes can capture more light which has the advantage of allowing more light to be captured before over saturation of the photodiode. Additionally, less noise is generated by adjacent pixels and their emf fields with larger photodiodes or greater spacing between photodiodes. For a given number of pixels, the larger sensor allows for larger pixels or photosites that provide wider dynamic range and lower noise at high ISO levels. As a consequence, full-frame DSLRs may produce better quality images in certain high contrast or low light situations.

Production costs for a full-frame sensor can exceed twenty times the costs for an APS-C sensor. Only 20 full-frame sensors will fit on an  silicon wafer, and yield is comparatively low because the sensor's large area makes it very vulnerable to contaminants—20 evenly distributed defects could theoretically ruin an entire wafer.  Additionally, when full-frame sensors were first produced, they required three separate exposures during the photolithography stage, tripling the number of masks and exposure processes. Modern photolithography equipment now allows single-pass exposures for full-frame sensors, but other size-related production constraints remain much the same.

Some full-frame DSLRs intended mainly for professional use include more features than typical consumer-grade DSLRs, so some of their larger dimensions and increased mass result from more rugged construction and additional features as opposed to this being an inherent consequence of the full-frame sensor.

Past and present full-frame DSLRs

DSLRs
 Canon EOS-1Ds (2002)
 Canon EOS-1Ds Mark II (2004)
 Canon EOS-1Ds Mark III (2007)
 Canon EOS-1D X (2012)
 Canon EOS-1D X Mark II (February 2, 2016)
 Canon EOS-1D X Mark III (January 2020)
 Canon EOS 5D (2005)
 Canon EOS 5D Mark II (2008)
 Canon EOS 5D Mark III (2 March  2012)
 Canon EOS 5Ds / 5Ds R (February 6, 2015)
 Canon EOS 5D Mark IV (August 2016)
 Canon EOS 6D (17 September 2012)
 Canon EOS 6D Mark II (30 June 2017)
Contax N Digital (2002)

 Kodak DCS Pro 14n (2003)

 Kodak DCS Pro SLR/c (2004)
 Kodak DCS Pro SLR/n (2004)
Nikon D3 (2007)
 Nikon D3X (2008)
 Nikon D3S (2009)
 Nikon D4 (2012)
 Nikon D4S (February 24, 2014)
 Nikon D5 (January 6, 2016)
Nikon D6 (February 11, 2020)
 Nikon D800 / Nikon D800E (2012)
 Nikon D810 (June 26, 2014)
 Nikon D850 (August 24, 2017)
 Nikon Df (5 November 2013)
 Nikon D700 (2008)
 Nikon D750 (September 12, 2014)
Nikon D780 (January 2020)
 Nikon D600 (13 September 2012)
 Nikon D610 (8 October 2013)

Pentax K-1 (February 18, 2016)
 Pentax K-1 II (February 21, 2018)
Sony α DSLR-A900 (2008)
 Sony α DSLR-A850 (2009)
 Sony α SLT-A99 / Sony α SLT-A99V (12 September 2012) (utilizing a semi-transparent SLT mirror)
 Sony α ILCA-99M2 (2016)

The Nikon E2/E2s (1994), E2N/E2NS (1996) and E3/E3S (1998) digital SLRs as well as the similar Fujifilm Fujix DS-505/DS-515, DS-505A/DS-515A and DS-560/DS-565 models used a reduction optical system (ROS) to compress a full-frame 35 mm field onto a smaller 2/3-inch (11 mm diagonal) CCD imager. They were therefore not digital SLRs with full-frame sensors, however had an angle of view equivalent to full-frame digital SLRs for a given lens; they had no crop factor with respect to angle of view.

The first full-frame DSLR cameras were developed in Japan from around 2000 to 2002: the MZ-D by Pentax, the N Digital by Contax's Japanese R6D team, and the EOS-1Ds by Canon.

Nikon has designated its full frame cameras as FX format and its smaller sensor interchangeable-lens camera formats as DX and CX.

Other technologies
 Sony Handycam NEX-VG900 (announced September 2012) – a 35mm full-frame video camera (also capable to shoot hi-resolution photos) with interchangeable lenses (Sony E-mount)
 Sony Cyber-shot DSC-RX1 (announced September 2012) and Sony Cyber-shot DSC-RX1R (announced June 2013) – full-frame compact cameras with fixed lens
 Sony Cyber-shot DSC-RX1R II – full-frame compact camera with fixed lens from 2015

Features of some full frame DSLR cameras

Prototype full-frame digital SLRs
 Pentax MZ-D "MR-52" (presented in 2000, based on Pentax MZ-S, with the same sensor as Contax N, it never went into production)
 Sony Alpha flagship model "CX62500" (presented at PMA 2007, early prototype of what one-and-a-half years later became the DSLR-A900 (aka "CX85100"), though with many detail differences)

See also
 Full-frame mirrorless interchangeable-lens camera
 Image sensor format

References

Digital SLR cameras
Digital photography
Japanese inventions